Satoshi Yamaguchi may refer to:
 Satoshi Yamaguchi (footballer, born 1959) (山口 悟), Japanese footballer
 Satoshi Yamaguchi (footballer, born 1978) (山口 智), Japanese footballer